Hamo Hethe was a medieval Bishop of Rochester, England. He was born about 1275 in Centuries, Hythe. He was elected on 18 March 1317 and consecrated on 26 August 1319. He resigned the see early 1352 before his death 4 May 1352.

Hethe, along with Archbishop Melton, John Ross and Stephen Gravesend, alone spoke up in Edward II's defence during the Parliamentary session that deposed Edward.

Citations

References

External links
 

Bishops of Rochester
14th-century English Roman Catholic bishops
1270s births
1352 deaths